Manapathur is a village in the Sendurai taluk of Ariyalur district, Tamil Nadu, India.

Demographics 

As per the 2001 census, Manapathur had a total population of 4773 with 2351 males and 2422 females.

References 

Villages in Ariyalur district